Paisius I (? – c. 1688) was a two-time Ecumenical Patriarch of Constantinople (August 1, 1652 – April 1653, March 1654 – March 1655). He was previously Bishop of Ephesus and Larissa.

Life
Paisius was born at the turn of the seventeenth century but the exact date of his birth is not known. He was from the Greek island of Lesbos. In a time of great turbulence, he was not particularly distinguished. After his second deposition, he established residence on the island of Halki, having received eis zoarkeian (that is, without pastoral obligations) the Metropolis of Ephesus and Cyzicus. The date and place of his death is not known, but he likely died at Halki in the late seventeenth century.

References

Sources

Bibliography 
 Venance Grumel, Traité d'études byzantines, « I. La Chronologie », Presses universitaires de France, Paris, 1958.

Bishops of Ephesus
Bishops of Larissa
17th-century Greek clergy
17th-century Ecumenical Patriarchs of Constantinople
People from Lesbos